Soumont is a commune in the Hérault department in the Occitanie region in southern France.

Geography

Climate
Soumont has a mediterranean climate (Köppen climate classification Csa).

Population

See also
 Communes of the Hérault department
 Grandmontines

References

External links

 Webpage about the Priory 
 Webpage about the Priory (2) 

Communes of Hérault